Argishti is a neighborhood in the Erebuni District of Yerevan, Armenia. It is very close by Verin Jrashen.

See also 
Kotayk Province

References 

Populated places in Kotayk Province